General elections were held in the Faroe Islands on 24 April 1918, the first in which women had the right to vote. Although the Union Party narrowly received the most votes, the result was a victory for the Self-Government Party, which won 11 of the 20 seats in the Løgting.

Results

References

Elections in the Faroe Islands
Faroe Islands
1918 in the Faroe Islands
April 1918 events
Election and referendum articles with incomplete results